Alex McIntosh (1936-2008) was a Scottish international lawn and indoor bowler.

Bowls career

World Championships
At the 1972 World Outdoor Bowls Championship in Worthing McIntosh won a silver medal in the fours and a gold medal in the team event (Leonard Trophy). Eight years later he won two more medals when winning silver in the fours and a bronze in the team event at the 1980 World Outdoor Bowls Championship in Melbourne.

Commonwealth Games
McIntosh won three Commonwealth Games medals; a silver in the 1970 Fours, gold medal in the 1974 Pairs and silver in the 1978 Pairs. McIntosh was the standard bearer at the 1978 Commonwealth Games in Edmonton.

National
McIntosh began bowling in 1955 and won his first international cap in 1962. His indoor club was Midlothian and outdoor club was Newbattle. He earned a total of 54 caps.

He won the 1968 fours title and two pairs titles (1973 & 1985) at the Scottish National Bowls Championships when bowling for the Newbattle Bowls Club.

Personal life
He was nicknamed "Big Tosh" and was an engineer at Lady Victoria Colliery. He was educated at Newtongrange Primary School and Newbattle Secondary. McIntosh died on 16 August 2008 aged 72.

References 

Scottish male bowls players
1936 births
2008 deaths
Commonwealth Games medallists in lawn bowls
Commonwealth Games gold medallists for Scotland
Commonwealth Games silver medallists for Scotland
Bowls players at the 1970 British Commonwealth Games
Bowls players at the 1974 British Commonwealth Games
Bowls players at the 1978 Commonwealth Games
Medallists at the 1970 British Commonwealth Games
Medallists at the 1974 British Commonwealth Games
Medallists at the 1978 Commonwealth Games